Francesco Gonzaga (15 March 1444, Mantua, Italy – 21 October 1483, Bologna, Italy ) was an Italian bishop and a Cardinal of the Roman Catholic Church during the reigns of Popes Pius II, Paul II and Sixtus IV.

Background 

Born in Mantua on 15 March 1444, Francesco Gonzaga was the second son of Ludovico III Gonzaga, the second Marquis of Mantua, and his wife Barbara of Brandenburg.  His mother was the daughter of John, Margrave of Brandenburg-Kulmbach, and the niece of Emperor Sigismund of the Holy Roman Empire. His first education was in the "Ca' Giocosa" under Iacopo da San Cassiano, Ognibene da Lonigo, and Bartolomeo Platina.

After completing his studies at Padua, Francesco went to the University of Pisa.  After he graduated, he was appointed by Pope Nicholas V to the offices of prothonotary apostolic in February 1454 and later of the Procurator of the Church for Mantua.  Although he had chosen an ecclesiastical career, he led a mostly secular life.  In 1477, when he had already been a Cardinal for eleven years,  a certain Barbara bore him an illegitimate son, Francesco ( † 1511 ), nicknamed "il Cardinalino [ The Little Cardinal ]".

The Cardinal

Under Pope Pius II 

At the request of his cousin, Albert III, the Elector of Brandenburg, Francesco was elevated, on 18 December 1461, at the age of seventeen to the rank of Cardinal by Pope Pius II after the Pope had been in Mantua for eight months for the council held in that city.  The meeting between the father, Ludovico III, the Marchese di Mantova, and the son, the new Cardinale di Mantova, coming to his hometown for the consecration as a cardinal, was immortalized in one of the most famous paintings of the Italian Renaissance – the frescoes of Andrea Mantegna's Camera degli Sposi ( Italian, "Chamber of the Bride" ).  Francesco was the first of the ten members of the House of Gonzaga to be given the red biretta of the cardinal and he was assigned to Santa Maria Nuova, a church near the Via Sacra in Rome.

Under Pope Paul II 

Appointed as the 39th Prince-Bishop of Bressanone ( now Brixen ) on 12 August 1464, the Cardinal of Mantua participated in the conclave that elected in the same year Pope Paul II, whom he personally hosted a splendid banquet on 16 September to commemorate the occasion of taking possession of the Throne of St. Peter by the new Pope.

Two years later, on 18 July 1466, the Bishop of Mantua, Galeazzo Cavriani, died and Francesco was appointed a month later, on 20 August, to succeed him.  His great grandfather's first cousin, Sagramoso Gonzaga ( 1360 – 1405 ), had been the Bishop of Mantua for four years ( 1386 – 1390 ).  But Francesco's own title was the Apostolic Administrator of the Diocese of Mantua.  He would keep it until his death but he was never raised to the rank of Bishop.  He would be succeeded by five consecutive members of his family. The first two were Apostolic Administrators but the third, Ercole Cardinal Gonzaga, Francesco's grandnephew, was the first to be Bishop.

Francesco participated in the secret consistories of 7 January 1467 and 30 June 1470.  During the consistory celebrated at the basilica of St. Mark on 18 February 1471, Pope Paul II appointed him the Papal legate a latere [ Latin, “from the [ Pope's] side" ] to Bologna and at the same time Francesco was appointed Apostolic Commissioner for the Paternal States [ commissario apostolico per gli stati paterni ], with the authority to persuade their dioceses in favor of a crusade against the Turks, which was, however, not accomplished at that time.  During his stay in Rome, where he had by then made his home, Francesco, with Marco Cardinal Barbo, welcomed the new Duke of Ferrara, Borso d'Este. He left Rome for Bologna on 5 July 1471 and arrived in Emilia on 21 July.

Under Pope Sixtus IV 

Francesco then returned to Rome on 4 August of that year to participate in the conclave of 1471 that elected Francesco della Rovere as Pope Sixtus IV.  For his legation in Bologna, Gonzaga was confirmed by the new Pope and received commendam also the Abbey of San Gregorio at Mantua but he renounced it on 18 March 1472 for the commendam of San Tommaso Maggiore at Verona.  On 2 May 1472, during his stay in Bologna, he received at his palace Johannes Cardinal Bessarion, who was passing on his way to France to negotiate peace between the King of France, Louis XI, and the Duke of Burgundy, Charles the Bold.

In the spring of 1472, Francesco was appointed as the Apostolic Administrator of the Metropolitan See of Lund in Sweden when Tuve Nielsen Juul, the Archbishop of Lund, died on 7 April.  For a while, it appeared that Gonzaga was about to be promoted to the rank of Archbishop but Jens Brostrup, who had already been elected by the Cathedral Chapter of Lund, managed to buy him out. Nevertheless, Francesco kept his position until 1474.  But he took the time to arrange and host a banquet in Bologna for the French ambassadors sent by King Louis XI to Pope Sixtus IV.  In 1472 he obtained the commendam of the monastery of Sant'Andrea in Mantua before he returned to Rome on 24 November 1473.  In April 1474 he was given the responsibility for welcoming to Rome, with proper honors, King Christian I of Denmark and Norway at the Papal Court.  As the reward for the excellence of his services, the Cardinal of Mantua was granted in 1475 by the Pope the commendam of the deaconry of Sant'Agata dei Goti, a church on Via Mazzarino in Rome.

Francesco fled from Rome on 10 June 1476 because of the outbreak of the plague at  the Papal Court.  A month later, on 18 July, the Bishop of Bologna, Filippo Calandrini, died. He was replaced eight days later, on 26 July, by the Cardinal of Mantua as the Apostolic Administrator but, in March 1477, he was still in Rome.  He did not go to Bologna for the actual possession until 18 July 1478, two years late.  On 20 March 1479, anti-Papal riots erupted in Bologna but Gonzaga was able to restore order.  However, he was never made the Bishop of Bologna; that title went after his death to Giuliano Cardinal della Rovere, the future Pope Julius II.

Francesco had already resigned his office of the Abbot of the Monastery of San Dionigi ( Saint Dionysius ) in Milan on 18 January 1478, seven months before he left for Bologna, and he also resigned the commendam of the Monastery of Santa Maria alla Gironda at Cremona on 18 June 1479.  It was given to his brother, Lodovico.  On 28 December 1480 the Cardinal returned to Rome from his mission and was re-appointed as the Papal legate a latere to Bologna on 15 December 1482.  But, before he could return to Bologna, he decided to go to Ferrara to encourage its residents to fight against the Republic of Venice, earning a reputation as a great orator.  Although he was a Prince of the Church, he was very generous with the poor and deeply devoted to Blessed Virgin Mary.

From 1479 to 1480 Francesco hosted Angelo Poliziano at his court in Mantua, where the scholar poet wrote the Fabula of Orpheus. Like other members of the family,  Francesco collected antiquities, including pieces of the treasures that belonged to Pope Paul II, himself a collector of gems.

Besides painting Francesco in the Camera deli Sposi, Andrea Mantegna also did the Portrait of Francesco Gonzaga, one of the first portraits he had ever done at the Court of Mantua after he moved there in 1460.  This painting is now at the National Museum of Capodimonte in Naples, Italy.

Death 

He died from intoxication on 21 October 1483 at the Palazzo della Signoria in Bologna. In the original document attesting to his death, it was stated that the cause of death was per disordini; percioché bevendo l'acqua della Porretta non servò la guardia conveniente [ Of disorders; because drinking the water of the Porretta, he did not observe the necessary care ]. His body was transported to Mantua and buried in the family mausoleum at the Church of San Francesco. The funeral oration was delivered by Giovanni Lucido Cataneo.

See also 
 House of Gonzaga
 Andrea Mantegna, Camera degli Sposi
 Andreas Mantegna, Portrait of Francesco Gonzaga ( ca. 1460 )

References

Bibliography 
  Isabella Lazzarini, "GONZAGA, Francesco", Dizionario Biografico degli Italiani [ Biographical Dictionary of the Italians ] – Volume 57 ( 2002 )
  Gabriella Mantovani, Il castello di Castel d'Ario ( Mantua : Sometti, 2012 ), 
 (in German) Charlotte Zweynert, Ausgleichende Verfügungen, verbindende Gegenstände, konkurrierende Interessen. Das Testament des zweitgeborenen Francesco Gonzaga aus dem Jahr 1483, in: Christine Fertig, Margareth Lanzinger (Hg.), Beziehungen, Vernetzungen, Konflikte. Perspektiven Historischer Verwandtschaftsforschung, Köln, Weimar, Wien 2016, S. 37–65.

External links 
  Salvador Miranda, Biography of Francesco Cardinal Gonzaga , "Biographical Dictionary : Pius II ( 1458 – 1464 ), Consistory of December 18, 1461 ( II ), Celebrated in Rome", The Cardinals of the Holy Roman Church
  Eleonore Gürtler, "Francesco Gonzaga ( 1444 – 1483 ), Kardinal", Kult.Doku : Verborgene Schätz aus Österreichischen Landesausstellungen [ Cult.Docu : Hidden Treasures of the Austrian National Exhibitions ]

1444 births
1483 deaths
Francesco 1444
Clergy from Mantua
15th-century Italian cardinals
Bishops of Brixen
Burials in the Cappella Gonzaga, San Francesco, Mantua